Marie-Madeleine Gauthier (25 April 1920 – 20 May 1998) was a French medieval art historian and author.

Gauthier was born in Langon, Gironde, France in 1920.  She studied at the University in Bordeaux where she became interested in medieval enamel in which she became a world expert.  She lived in the US from 1964-1967.  She died in Langon in 1998.

Works

 Highways of the Faith - relics and reliquaries from Jerusalem to Compostela, Wellfleet Press, 1983

References

1920 births
1998 deaths
French art historians
French medievalists
Women medievalists
20th-century French historians
French women historians
Women art historians
Corresponding Fellows of the Medieval Academy of America
20th-century French women writers
French expatriates in the United States